The men's discus throw event was part of the track and field athletics programme at the 1948 Summer Olympics. Twenty-eight athletes from 18 nations competed. The maximum number of athletes per nation had been set at 3 since the 1930 Olympic Congress. The competition was held on August 2. The final was won by Adolfo Consolini of Italy. It was the nation's first victory in the men's discus throw; Italy had previously taken bronze in 1936. Giuseppe Tosi earned silver to put Italy in the top two places. Fortune Gordien of the United States won bronze, keeping the Americans on the podium in each appearance of the men's discus throw to date.

Background

This was the 11th appearance of the event, which is one of 12 athletics events to have been held at every Summer Olympics. The returning finalists from the 1936 Games were bronze medalist Giorgio Oberweger of Italy and sixth-place finisher Nikolaos Syllas of Greece. Oberweger's teammates, Adolfo Consolini (who had held the world record until 1946, and would take it back later in 1948) and Giuseppe Tosi, were the favorites after finishing first and second in the European championships. The biggest challenger outside of Italy was American Fortune Gordien, the 1947 and 1948 AAU champion. World record holder and inventor of the Minnesota Whip technique Bob Fitch was unable to attend the Games.

South Korea, Pakistan, and Peru each made their debut in the men's discus throw. The United States made its 11th appearance, having competed in every edition of the Olympic men's discus throw to date.

Competition format

The competition used the two-round format introduced in 1936, with the qualifying round completely separate from the divided final. In qualifying, each athlete received three attempts; those recording a mark of at least 46.00 metres advanced to the final. If fewer than 12 athletes achieved that distance, the top 12 would advance. The results of the qualifying round were then ignored. Finalists received three throws each, with the top six competitors receiving an additional three attempts. The best distance among those six throws counted.

Records

Prior to the competition, the existing world and Olympic records were as follows.

Adolfo Consolini and Giuseppe Tosi both beat the Olympic record in the qualifying round, with Consolini's throw going 51.08 metres. Tosi's first throw in the final bettered that, at 51.78 metres. Consolini responded with a 52.78 metres throw in the second set. The bronze medalist, Fortune Gordien, also exceeded the old record.

Schedule

All times are British Summer Time (UTC+1)

Results

Qualifying round

Qual. rule: qualification standard 46.00m (Q) or at least best 12 qualified (q). Individual throw results are not known, though Consolini and Tosi's qualifying throws were on the first attempt. Frank fouled on his first and third throws.

Final

References

External links
Organising Committee for the XIV Olympiad, The (1948). The Official Report of the Organising Committee for the XIV Olympiad. LA84 Foundation. Retrieved 5 September 2016.

Athletics at the 1948 Summer Olympics
Discus throw at the Olympics
Men's events at the 1948 Summer Olympics